Sam Thomas Evans (born 20 December 1997) is an English cricketer. He made his first-class debut on 28 March 2017 for Loughborough MCCU against Leicestershire as part of the Marylebone Cricket Club University fixtures. He made his List A debut for Leicestershire against India A in a tri-series warm-up match on 19 June 2018.

References

External links
 

1997 births
Living people
English cricketers
Loughborough MCCU cricketers
Cricketers from Leicester